François Truffaut: Stolen Portraits is a 1993 French documentary film directed by Michel Pascal and Serge Toubiana, about the film director François Truffaut. It was screened in the Un Certain Regard section at the 1993 Cannes Film Festival.

Cast

Fanny Ardant as herself
Olivier Assayas as himself
Alexandre Astruc as himself
Jean Aurel as himself
Nathalie Baye as herself
Janine Bazin as herself
Marcel Berbert as himself
Claude Chabrol as himself
Yann Dedet as himself
Catherine Deneuve
Gérard Depardieu as himself
Albert Duchenne as himself
Claude de Givray as himself
Jean Gruault as himself
Annette Insdorf as herself
Claude Jade as herself
Robert Lachenay as himself
Jean-Pierre Léaud
Monique Lucas as herself
Claude Miller as himself
Jeanne Moreau
Madeleine Morgenstern as herself
Marcel Ophüls as himself
Marie-France Pisier as herself
Jean-Louis Richard as himself
Eric Rohmer as himself
Henri Serre
Liliane Siegel as herself
Bertrand Tavernier as himself
Eva Truffaut as herself
Laura Truffaut as herself
Oskar Werner (archive footage)

Reception
Stanley Kauffmann at The New Republic wrote 'In human and in film-historical terms, this Toubiana-Pascal documentary is a treasure. It ought to be shown wherever there's a Truffaut audience, and it ought to be made available on tape.' Todd McCarthy of the Variety Magazine said that:Film critics Serge Toubiana and Michel Pascal have made a revealing but far from definitive docu study of the life and career of the late French director Francois Truffaut. Interviews with an impressive lineup of friends, associates and family members peel away layers of the onion to unveil aspects of the subject's personality that were largely undiscussed during his lifetime.

References

External links

1993 documentary films
1993 films
1990s French-language films
French documentary films
Documentary films about film directors and producers
1990s French films